Copper benzoate is the chemical compound with the formula Cu(C6H5CO2)2.  This coordination complex is derived from the cupric ion and the conjugate base of benzoic acid. Because copper emits blue in a flame, this salt has found some use as a source of blue light in fireworks.

Preparation
In laboratory, copper benzoate can be made by combining aqueous solutions of potassium benzoate with copper sulfate.  Copper benzoate precipitates as a pale blue solid:
2 C6H5COOK  +  CuSO4   →   Cu(C6H5COO)2  +  K2SO4

The primary use of this compound is in production of blue flame in fireworks.  Copper benzoate made from sodium benzoate for use in fireworks may result in strong yellow dilution of the flame unless the precipitate is carefully washed to remove sodium ion (which emits brightly yellow). Emission from potassium does not complicate the emission spectrum.

Structure
Copper(II) benzoates exists in at least two structural forms, depending on the degree of hydration. As of copper(II) acetate, the benzoate adopts a "Chinese lantern" structure, wherein a pair of copper centers are linked by four bridging carboxylate ligands. Typically one site on each copper center is occupied by water, which can be replaced by other ligands.  A hydrated form is also known, wherein each Cu(II) centre is bound to four water ligands and benzoate.

References

Copper(II) compounds
Benzoates